Tommi Ahvala, (born November 13, 1971) is a Finnish former world champion motorcycle trials rider. He won the 1992 World Motorcycle Trials Championship and the 1993 Indoor Trials World Championship.

Biography 
Born in Helsinki, Finland, Ahvala began practicing trial as a hobby at the age of six in his backyard. He participated in the first competition at the age of 10. When he was 15 he began to compete internationally and he participated in the World Trial Championship for the first time in 1988. He was not yet an adult, so when competing in Finland he had to use a 125-cc motorcycle, and when abroad a 250 cc one. He was granted a special driving permission at the age of 17.

In 1989 Ahvala finished in sixth place at the World Championship, 4th in 1990, and 2nd in 1991. He also won the gold medal in 1990 and 1991 in the Finnish Championship, which he then left due to lack of time. In 1992 Ahvala won the World Motorcycle Trials Championship. The following year he won the indoor title.

In 1995 he was the first foreigner to win the Italian Trials Championship.

In 1998, he was hired by the Spanish motorcycle manufacturer Gas Gas to compete in the United States. He competed in the A.M.A. National Championship in 1998 and 1999, winning the 1999 title. Afterwards, he began teaching in a series of trials schools, in an effort to raise the level of competitiveness, as well as the level of public awareness of the sport in the United States.

Finland printed a postage stamp in Ahvala's honor in 1995.

International Trials Championship Career

Honors 
 FIM World Trials Champion 1992
 Finnish Trials Champion 1989,1990,1991,2005
 Italian Trials Champion 1995
 US NATC Trials Champion 1999
 Best sportsman in the metropolitan area in 1991 (elected by the sportswriters of Helsinki)
 Driver Badges awarded by Finnish Motorcycling Federation :
  Bronze driver badge in 1986
  Silver driver badge in 1986
  Masterdriver badge in 1990
  Masterdriver badge with grandmaster symbols in 1991
 Honorary Member of Canzo, Italy, in 1992

References

External links 
 Tommi Ahvala Supertrial site

1971 births
Living people
Sportspeople from Helsinki
Finnish motorcycle racers
Motorcycle trials riders